Brittany Lang (born August 22, 1985) is an American professional golfer who plays on the LPGA Tour. She has won one major championship, the 2016 U.S. Women's Open.

Amateur career
Born in Richmond, Virginia and raised in McKinney, Texas, Lang had a decorated amateur career. She won eight American Junior Golf Association (AJGA) events and was a two-time First-Team Polo Golf Junior All-American, in 2001 and 2002. Lang represented the United States at the PING Junior Solheim Cup in 2002. In 2003, she won the North and South Women's Amateur and the Women's Western Amateur in consecutive weeks. She also won the 2004 Trans National Amateur title.

Following graduation from McKinney High School in 2003, Lang played golf at Duke University for two years and won six collegiate tournaments. She was also named the 2004 Atlantic Coast Conference Freshman of the Year and NCAA Freshman College Golfer of the Year, and the 2005 ACC Player of the Year and won back-to-back ACC individual titles in 2004 and 2005.

Lang was also a member of the victorious Curtis Cup team in 2004 and won medalist honors at the U.S. Women's Amateur Public Links, where she advanced to the quarterfinals of match play.

While still an amateur in 2005, Lang competed as a sponsor's exemption in both the Kraft Nabisco Championship and the LPGA Corning Classic, where she tied for 15th. She finished her amateur career at the U.S. Women's Open at Cherry Hills, where she tied for second with fellow low amateur Morgan Pressel, two strokes behind champion Birdie Kim. With the last hole to play, Lang was in the clubhouse when Kim holed out from the 18th greenside bunker to seal the victory.

Professional career
After two years of college golf at Duke, Lang turned professional in July 2005, shortly after her T2 finish at the U.S. Women's Open.  She received sponsor's exemptions in 2005 to the Jamie Farr Owens Corning Classic (T36), State Farm Classic, and Canadian Women's Open (T6).  She was the medalist in the first stage of the LPGA Qualifying Tournament in September, then finished T22 at the final stage in December to earn full playing privileges for the 2006 season.

Lang recorded six top-ten finishes, in 2006 and 2008. At the end of 2008, her third season on the LPGA Tour, her career earnings exceeded $1 million.

Lang's first professional win came in June 2012 at the inaugural Manulife Financial LPGA Classic in Canada, where she triumphed in a four-player playoff. She birdied the last hole four consecutive times to win the playoff. It was the first-ever victory in an LPGA event by a former Duke Blue Devil, and Lang's 154th event on tour.

Lang has seven top ten finishes in major championships: six as a professional and one as an amateur. She won the U.S. Women's Open in 2016 at CordeValle and was a solo runner-up at the Women's British Open in 2011 at Carnoustie.

She has represented the United States in four successive Solheim Cups in 2009, 2011, 2013, and 2015. She was undefeated in singles play until falling to Melissa Reid in 2015.

Professional wins (2)

LPGA Tour wins (2)

LPGA Tour playoff record (2–0)

Major championships

Wins (1)

1 Defeated Nordqvist in a three-hole aggregate playoff: Lang (3-4-5=12) and Nordqvist (3-6-6=15)

Results timeline
Results not in chronological order before 2019.

^ The Evian Championship was added as a major in 2013

LA = Low amateur
CUT = missed the half-way cut
NT = no tournament
T = tied

Summary

Most consecutive cuts made – 9 (2009 Kraft Nabisco – 2011 Kraft Nabisco)
Longest streak of top-10s – 2 (2005 U.S. Open – 2006 Kraft Nabisco)

LPGA Tour career summary

 official as of 2022 season
* Includes matchplay and other events without a cut.

World ranking
Position in Women's World Golf Rankings at the end of each calendar year.

Team appearances
Amateur
Junior Solheim Cup (representing the United States): 2002 (winners)
Curtis Cup (representing the United States): 2004 (winners)

Professional
Solheim Cup (representing the United States): 2009 (winners), 2011, 2013, 2015 (winners), 2017 (winners)

Solheim Cup record

References

External links

American female golfers
Duke Blue Devils women's golfers
LPGA Tour golfers
Winners of LPGA major golf championships
Solheim Cup competitors for the United States
Golfers from Virginia
Golfers from Texas
Golfers from Orlando, Florida
Sportspeople from Richmond, Virginia
People from McKinney, Texas
1985 births
Living people